Feliks Anton Dev (January 15, 1732 – November 7, 1786; monastic name Joannes Damascenus a nomine Mariae, Slovenized as ) was a Slovene poet, translator, and editor.

Dev was born in Tržič in 1732. He studied at the Jesuit college in Ljubljana and then joined the Discalced Augustinians, where he took the monastic name Joannes Damascenus a nomine Mariae (John of Damascus in the name of Mary). He studied theology in Vienna, where he was ordained in 1755 and then taught philosophy and theology. He is considered the first secular poet in Slovene, and he edited the poetry almanac  (Writings of Beautiful Art, 1779–1781). Dev died in Ljubljana.

References

1732 births
1786 deaths
Slovenian Catholic poets
Slovenian lexicographers
Slovenian editors
18th-century lexicographers